is a Japanese manga series written and illustrated by Rensuke Oshikiri. It was serialized in Kodansha's seinen manga magazine Monthly Morning Two from August 2016 to June 2020, with its chapters collected in five tankōbon volumes.

Publication
Kodansha collected its chapters in five tankōbon volumes, released from April 21, 2017, to September 18, 2020.

Volume list

Reception
The series ranked first in the June 2017 edition of Takarajimasha's Kono Manga ga Sugoi! Web.

See also
Hi Score Girl, another manga series by the same author
Pupipō!, another manga series by the same author

References

Further reading

External links
 

Kodansha manga
Seinen manga